King Lear is a 1971 Soviet drama film directed by Grigori Kozintsev, based on William Shakespeare's play King Lear. The film uses Boris Pasternak's translation of the play, while the Fool's songs are translated by Samuil Marshak. This was the last of Grigori Kozintsev's films.

Production
Grigori Kozintsev considered many actors for the role of Lear. The casting director first suggested Jüri Järvet for the small part of a tramp, but Kozintsev offered him the title role. He later explained: "The internal world of this actor seemed attractive to me. This is an actor of deep thought. He is able to play the role with philosophical depth. Järvet is equally strong in humour, in that particular sort of humour that sometimes touches upon grotesque". Järvet was only 50 years old by the time of filming. 

The role of Goneril is portrayed by Latvian actress Elza Radziņa, who also appeared in  Kozintsev's Hamlet as Gertrude. Radzina was one of the co-founders of the Sovremennik Theatre. The role of Regan went to Galina Volchek, whose casting was first met with some skepticism but went on to be a success. The relatively unknown Valentina Shendrikova of the Mayakovsky Theatre plays Cordelia. Oleg Dahl, one of the stars of the Sovremennik Theatre, was chosen to play the Fool without an audition, after a short conversation with the director. His performance received wide critical acclaim. Kozintsev also incorporated a number of experienced theatre actors from Latvia and Lithuania: Donatas Banionis as Albany, Kārlis Sebris as Gloucester, Leonhard Merzin as Edgar, and Regimantas Adomaitis as Edmund. The role of Oswald went to then-unknown Aleksei Petrenko. 

The film was shot primarily in Narva and Ivangorod. Its extensive set of houses and streets was built inside the Ivangorod Fortress, which was under reconstruction at the time of filming. The film's scenic designers were Evgeny Eney and Vsevolod Ulitko; its costumes were created by the chief designer of the Bolshoi Theatre Simon Virsaladze. Dmitri Shostakovich composed the score.

Cast
 Jüri Järvet as King Lear (voiced by Zinovy Gerdt)
 Elza Radziņa as Goneril (voiced by Nina Nikitina)
 Galina Volchek as Regan
 Valentina Shendrikova as Cordelia
 Oleg Dahl as Fool
 Kārlis Sebris as Gloucester (voiced by Grigori Gay)
 Leonhard Merzin as Edgar  (voiced by Emmanuil Vitorgan) 
 Regimantas Adomaitis as Edmund
 Vladimir Yemelyanov as Kent
 Aleksandr Vokach as Cornwall
 Donatas Banionis as Albany (voiced by Aleksandr Demyanenko)
 Aleksei Petrenko as Oswald
 Juozas Budraitis as King of France

Accolades
 Tehran International Film Festival (1972): Grand Prix (Grigori Kozintsev) and Best Actor Award (Jüri Järvet)
 Chicago International Film Festival (1972): Silver Hugo for Best Director (Grigori Kozintsev)
 Milan International Film Festival (1973): Golden Medal (Grigori Kozintsev)

See also
 List of historical drama films

References

External links

1971 films
1971 drama films
Soviet drama films
Russian drama films
Lenfilm films
Soviet black-and-white films
Films directed by Grigori Kozintsev
Films based on King Lear
Films scored by Dmitri Shostakovich
Russian black-and-white films